Fulton Place is a residential neighbourhood in east Edmonton, Alberta, Canada.  It is named for the creek which runs along the neighbourhood's west boundary.  It is part of a broader area of surrounding communities  known as Greater Hardisty.

The neighbourhood is bounded on the north by 106 Avenue, on the south by 101 Avenue, on the east by 50 Street, and on the west and south west by Fulton Creek Ravine.  At the north west corner of the neighbourhood is an interchange between 106 Avenue and Wayne Gretzky Drive.

The community is represented by the Fulton Place Community League, established in 1958, which maintains a community hall and outdoor rink located at 61 Street and Fulton Road.

Demographics 

Residential development 
While a small percentage (3.4%) of the residences in Fulton Place were built before the end of World War II, according to the 2001 federal census four out of five (79.1%) of all residences were built between 1946 and 1960.  Another one in ten (9.6%) residences were built during the 1960s.  A small proportion of residences were built after 1970.

The most common type of residence in the neighbourhood, according to the 2005 municipal census, is the single-family dwelling.  These account for almost nine out of every ten (86%) residences in the neighbourhood.  Another one residence in twenty (6%) are rented apartments in low-rise buildings with fewer than five stories.  There are a small number (1%) of duplexes.  The remaining one residence in twenty (7%) are classified as other kinds of residence.  Almost nine out of every ten (85%) of all residences are owner-occupied while the remaining residences are rented.

Schools and recreation facilities 
Hardisty School, operated by the Edmonton Public School System, is located in Fulton Place with over 600 students enrolled in kindergarten through grade 9. Fulton Place School, formerly an elementary school, was closed in 2010 and the building is now used by several non-profit and community-based organizations.

Hardisty Fitness and Leisure Centre and the Michael Cameron Arena are both located in the neighbourhood.

Surrounding neighbourhoods

See also 
 Edmonton Federation of Community Leagues

References

External links 
 Fulton Place Neighbourhood Profile

Neighbourhoods in Edmonton